Leptostylopsis basifulvus is a species of longhorn beetles of the subfamily Lamiinae. It was described by Lingafelter and Micheli in 2009.

References

Acanthocinini
Beetles described in 2009